George McContyre Marshall (13 May 1834 – 27 February 1915) was a member of the Wisconsin State Assembly.

Biography
Marshall was born in Lower Canada. His father was a cousin of Rufus Choate, a member of the United States House of Representatives and the United States Senate. Marshall married Julia A. Hoyt (1834–1900). They had seven children. He and his son Frank founded a machining business in what is now Wisconsin Dells, Wisconsin. He died of pneumonia in 1915.

Political career
Marshall was a member of the Assembly during the 1875 and 1876 sessions. Additionally, he was a town chairman (similar to mayor). He was a Republican.

References

1834 births
1915 deaths
Pre-Confederation Quebec people
People from Wisconsin Dells, Wisconsin
Republican Party members of the Wisconsin State Assembly
Mayors of places in Wisconsin
Machinists
Businesspeople from Wisconsin
Pre-Confederation Canadian emigrants to the United States
19th-century American businesspeople